"Fuck It (I Don't Want You Back)" is the debut single of American singer-songwriter Eamon. The song was co-written by Eamon, Kirk Robinson and Mark Passy. It was released on November 10, 2003, as the lead single from his debut album, I Don't Want You Back (2004). The song is notable for the frequency of its expletives. 

"Fuck It (I Don't Want You Back)" topped the charts in many countries, including Australia, Denmark, Italy, New Zealand, and the United Kingdom. The single appeared in Billboard magazine as "F**k It (I Don't Want You Back)". An Italian-language version titled "Solo" was also released, reaching number two in Italy.

History
The success of the single and the controversial nature of its lyrics prompted production of an answer song, "F.U.R.B. (Fuck You Right Back)", by female singer Frankee, who claimed to be Eamon's ex-girlfriend. While Eamon initially said that he selected Frankee to record the song at an audition, he later stated that his only involvement was in clearing the use of the music with the following statement:

"I was not involved with 'F.U.R.B.' I have never met Frankee and she is definitely not my girlfriend or ex-girlfriend. The only way I was associated with it was when I was asked for licensing permission by Frankee's representatives, which makes me a writer on her song by copyright law. But I really didn't expect all this to come out of it, they are having fun with it, it's cool but in the end they are paying me for their 15 minutes of fame and I welcome her to my world of Ho-Wop!"

During the success of both songs in the United Kingdom, BBC Radio 1 host Chris Moyles was heavily critical of them, going as far as to record and broadcast his own spoof version; "We Want You to Leave", claiming that both singles were the product of what amounted to nothing more than a cynical marketing ploy by Eamon and Frankee's record labels.

Because of the great success of the song in Italy, an Italian version of the song was released. Its title was "Solo" and its lyrics, written by J-Ax, were changed so they did not contain any expression deemed offensive. "Solo" reached number two on the Italian Singles Chart and ended 2004 as the country's 32nd-best-selling hit.

The song reached number 1 in the Netherlands and even lead to a parody song called "Vakkenvuller" by Dutch singer Hans Goes (using the alias 'Simon'), which was also a big hit.

Music video
The video starts with black and white footage of Eamon and his girlfriend enjoying a trip together, then it cuts to color purporting to be present day outside at Bari's Pizza in Staten Island, New York. Eamon and his girlfriend are sitting across from one another while a different couple at another table kiss each other. Eamon's girlfriend starts to well up with tears in her eyes while Eamon is singing.

A teardrop comes out of her left eye and drops into a puddle below, causing ripples to appear. The video then cuts to varying scenes of couples on park benches, Eamon in a sound recording booth, and Eamon in a room as he rips a picture to shreds and throws a wine bottle at the camera. Eamon stands with his back to the Brooklyn Bridge, singing. The video cuts back to Bari's Pizza showing the girl continuing to cry, as Eamon angrily throws the pizza on the ground and then gets up and walks away on a path and the girl gets up.

The video ends with footage of them both kissing in black and white then cutting back to the present with Eamon walking along a pathway and his girlfriend follows him.

Track listing

Single version

EP version

iTunes album version

Charts

Weekly charts

Year-end charts

Decade-end charts

Certifications

Release history

References

2000s ballads
2003 debut singles
2003 songs
Contemporary R&B ballads
Dutch Top 40 number-one singles
Eamon (singer) songs
European Hot 100 Singles number-one singles
Irish Singles Chart number-one singles
Jive Records singles
Number-one singles in Australia
Number-one singles in Austria
Number-one singles in Denmark
Number-one singles in Germany
Number-one singles in Italy
Number-one singles in New Zealand
Number-one singles in Norway
Number-one singles in Scotland
Number-one singles in Sweden
Number-one singles in Switzerland
Songs about infidelity
Songs written by Kirk Robinson
UK Singles Chart number-one singles
Ultratop 50 Singles (Flanders) number-one singles